1994 in sports describes the year's events in world sport.

Alpine skiing
 January 29 – death of Ulrike Maier (26), Austrian skier, who broke her neck when she crashed during a World Cup downhill race at Garmisch-Partenkirchen
 Alpine Skiing World Cup
 Men's overall season champion: Kjetil André Aamodt, Norway
 Women's overall season champion: Vreni Schneider, Switzerland

American football
 Super Bowl XXVIII – the Dallas Cowboys (NFC) won 30–13 over the Buffalo Bills (AFC)
Location: Georgia Dome
Attendance: 72,817
MVP: Emmitt Smith, RB (Dallas)
Note: It is the fourth consecutive Super Bowl appearance by the Bills as well as their fourth consecutive loss.  This is also the first (and thus far only) time that the same two teams have met in consecutive Super Bowls.  
 Orange Bowl (1993 season):
 The Florida State Seminoles won 18–16 over the Nebraska Cornhuskers to win the national championship.
 October 23 – in a game where the New Orleans Saints beat the Los Angeles Rams 37–34 Robert Bailey of the Rams sets the NFL record for longest punt return (103 yards) and Tyrone Hughes of the Saints sets the NFL single game record for kickoff return yards (304) and most return yards (347) and ties the single game record for kickoff returns returned for touchdown (2).
 October 31 – In a rainy and windy game at Soldier Field on Monday Night Football, Dick Buktus' and Gale Sayers' Jerseys were retired at Halftime, but the Bears were blown away by Brett Favre and the Packers, 6–33.
 November 13 – Drew Bledsoe sets NFL single game records for pass attempts (70) and pass completions (45) helping New England Patriots beat Minnesota Vikings 26–20.

Association football
 Brazil won the 1994 FIFA World Cup, hosted in the USA 
 July 2 – death of Andrés Escobar, Colombian player, who was shot dead apparently because of an own goal he had scored in a World Cup match

Athletics
 February 20 – in Boston, Massachusetts, Ireland's 41-year-old Eamonn Coghlan becomes the first man over the age of forty to run a sub-four minute mile when he clocks 3min.58.15sec.
 August – 1994 European Championships in Athletics held at Helsinki
 August – 1994 Commonwealth Games held at Victoria, British Columbia, Canada

Australian rules football
 Australian Football League
 The West Coast Eagles win the 98th AFL premiership (West Coast Eagles 20.23 (143) d Geelong 8.15 (63))
 Brownlow Medal awarded to Greg Williams (Carlton)in 1994

Baseball
 January 12 – Steve Carlton, winner of 329 games and four Cy Young Awards, is elected to the Baseball Hall of Fame.
 June 22 – OF Ken Griffey Jr. leads the Mariners to a 12–3 win over the Angels by stroking his 31st home run of the season. In doing so, Griffey Jr. breaks Babe Ruth's record for most home runs before the end of June.
 September 14 – A labor strike by Major League Baseball players results in the premature termination of the season, and the cancellation of the World Series for the first time since 1904. The Montreal Expos were the league-leading team up to the strike, with a 74–40 record.
 Mets pitcher John Franco breaks Dave Righetti's major league record for left-handers of 252 career saves.
 The Richmond Braves win the International League championship.
 The Albuquerque Dukes win the Pacific Coast League championship.
 The Indianapolis Indians win the American Association championship.
 The Winnipeg Goldeyes win the Northern League championship.
 The Yomiuri Giants win the Japan Series, and in the view of the baseball media, are World Champions.

Basketball
NBA Finals - Houston Rockets win four games to three over the New York Knicks
NCAA men's basketball tournament was won by the University of Arkansas defeating Duke University, 76-72
NCAA women's basketball tournament was won by the University of North Carolina defeating Louisiana Tech University, 60-59

Boxing
 January 29 – Frankie Randall causes Julio César Chávez his first defeat in 91 professional bouts, winning the WBC world Jr. Welterweight title in the process, by a split decision in 12 rounds.
 November 5 – forty-five-year-old George Foreman becomes boxing's oldest heavyweight champion when he knocked out Michael Moorer in the 10th round of a Las Vegas fight.

Canadian football
 Grey Cup – B.C. Lions win 26–23 over the Baltimore Stallions
 Vanier Cup – Western Ontario Mustangs win 50–40 over the Saskatchewan Huskies

Cycling
 Giro d'Italia won by Eugeni Berzin of Russia
 Tour de France – Miguel Indurain of Spain
 UCI Road World Championships – Men's road race – Luc Leblanc of France
 Djamolidine Abdoujaparov becomes the first cyclist (and only as of 2007) to win the points classification at the Tour de France and Giro d'Italia in the same year.

Dogsled racing
 Iditarod Trail Sled Dog Race Champion –
 Martin Buser wins with lead dogs: D2 & Dave

Field hockey
 Men's Champions Trophy: Pakistan
 Men's World Cup: Pakistan
 Women's World Cup: Australia

Figure skating
 World Figure Skating Championships –
 Men's champion: Elvis Stojko, Canada
 Ladies' champion: Yuka Sato, Japan
 Pairs' champions: Evgenia Shishkova and Vadim Naumov, Russia
 Ice dancing champions: Oksana Grishuk and Evgeny Platov, Russia

Floorball 
 Floorball European Championship – Men's champion: Sweden
 European Cup
 Men's champion: Balrog IK
 Women's champion: Sjöstad IF

Gaelic Athletic Association
 Camogie
 All-Ireland Camogie Champion: Kilkenny
 National Camogie League: Galway
 Gaelic football
 All-Ireland Senior Football Championship – Down 1–12 v Dublin 0–13
 National Football League – Meath 2–11 v Armagh 0–8
 Ladies' Gaelic football
 All-Ireland Senior Football Champion: Waterford
 National Football League: Monaghan
 Hurling
 All-Ireland Senior Hurling Championship – Offaly 3–16 v Limerick 2–13
 National Hurling League – Tipperary 2–14 beat Galway

Golf
Men's professional
 Masters Tournament – José María Olazábal
 U.S. Open – Ernie Els
 British Open – Nick Price
 PGA Championship – Nick Price
 PGA Tour money leader – Nick Price – $1,499,927
 Senior PGA Tour money leader – Dave Stockton – $1,402,519
Men's amateur
 British Amateur – Lee James
 U.S. Amateur – Tiger Woods becomes the youngest man ever to win the U.S. Amateur, at age 18.
 European Amateur – Stephen Gallacher
Women's professional
 Nabisco Dinah Shore – Donna Andrews
 LPGA Championship – Laura Davies
 U.S. Women's Open – Patty Sheehan
 Classique du Maurier – Martha Nause
 LPGA Tour money leader – Laura Davies – $687,201
 Solheim Cup won by the United States team who beat the European team 13 to 7.

Handball
 Men's European Championship: Sweden
 Women's European Championship: Denmark

Harness racing
 North America Cup – Cam's Card Shark
 United States Pacing Triple Crown races –
 Cane Pace – Falcons Future
 Little Brown Jug – Magical Mike
 Messenger Stakes – Cam's Card Shark
 United States Trotting Triple Crown races –
 Hambletonian – Victory Dream
 Yonkers Trot – Bullville Victory
 Kentucky Futurity – Bullville Victory
 Australian Inter Dominion Harness Racing Championship –
 Pacers: Weona Warrior
 Trotters: Diamond Field

Horse racing
Steeplechases
 Cheltenham Gold Cup – The Fellow
 Grand National – Miinnehoma
Flat races
 Australia – Melbourne Cup won by Jeune
 Canada – Queen's Plate won by Basqueian
 France – Prix de l'Arc de Triomphe won by Carnegie
 Ireland – Irish Derby Stakes won by Balanchine
 Japan
 Narita Brian won the Satsuki Sho (Japanese 2,000 Guineas), Tokyo Yushun (Japanese Derby), and Kikuka Sho (Japanese St. Leger) to become the first horse since 1984 to win the Japanese Triple Crown.
 Japan Cup won by Marvelous Crown
 English Triple Crown Races:
 2,000 Guineas Stakes – Mister Baileys
 The Derby – Erhaab
 St. Leger Stakes – Moonax
 United States Triple Crown Races:
 Kentucky Derby – Go for Gin
 Preakness Stakes – Tabasco Cat
 Belmont Stakes – Tabasco Cat
 Breeders' Cup World Thoroughbred Championships:
 Breeders' Cup Classic – Concern
 Breeders' Cup Distaff – One Dreamer
 Breeders' Cup Juvenile – Timber Country
 Breeders' Cup Juvenile Fillies – Flanders
 Breeders' Cup Mile – Barathea
 Breeders' Cup Sprint – Cherokee Run
 Breeders' Cup Turf – Tikkanen

Ice hockey
 January 4 - Canada won gold in the World Junior. Sweden was silver and Russia was bronze.
 February 27 - Sweden won gold medal in the Winter Olympics. Canada won silver and Finland, bronze.
 May 8 - Canada won gold at the World Championship. Finland was silver and Sweden, bronze.
 June 14 – The New York Rangers won the Stanley Cup for the 1993–1994 season 4 games to 3 over the Vancouver Canucks, ending a 54-year drought.
 October 1 – The NHL locked out its players and the regular season was put on hold for the next 3½ months and the season began under a 48-game schedule through 1995.
 Art Ross Trophy as the NHL's leading scorer during the regular season: Wayne Gretzky, Los Angeles Kings
 Hart Memorial Trophy – for the NHL's Most Valuable Player:  Sergei Fedorov – Detroit Red Wings
 World Hockey Championship
 Men's champion: Canada defeated Finland
 Junior Men's champion: Canada defeated Sweden
 Women's champion:  Canada defeated the United States

Kickboxing
The following is a list of major noteworthy kickboxing events during 1994 in chronological order.

Before 2000, K-1 was considered the only major kickboxing promotion in the world.

|-
|align=center style="border-style: none none solid solid; background: #e3e3e3"|Date
|align=center style="border-style: none none solid solid; background: #e3e3e3"|Event
|align=center style="border-style: none none solid solid; background: #e3e3e3"|Location
|align=center style="border-style: none none solid solid; background: #e3e3e3"|Attendance
|align=center style="border-style: none none solid solid; background: #e3e3e3"|Notes
|-align=center
|March 4
|K-1 Challenge
| Tokyo, Japan
|15,000
|
|-align=center
|April 30
|K-1 Grand Prix '94
| Tokyo, Japan
|11,000
|
|-align=center
|May 8
|K-2 Plus Tournament 1994
| Amsterdam, Netherlands
|
|
|-align=center
|September 18
|K-1 Revenge
| Tokyo, Japan
|14,000
|
|-align=center
|December 10
|K-1 Legend
| Nagoya, Japan
|9,550
|
|-align=center

Lacrosse
 The 7th World Lacrosse Championship is held in Manchester, England. The United States win and Australia is the runner-up.
 The Philadelphia Wings beat the Buffalo Bandits 26–15 in the Major Indoor Lacrosse League Championship.
 The Six Nations Chiefs win the Mann Cup.
 The Orillia Rogers Kings win the Founders Cup.
 The New Westminster Salmonbellies win the Minto Cup.

Mixed martial arts
The following is a list of major noteworthy MMA events during 1994 in chronological order.

Before 1997, the Ultimate Fighting Championship (UFC) was considered the only major MMA organization in the world and featured many fewer rules than are used in modern MMA.

|-
|align=center style="border-style: none none solid solid; background: #e3e3e3"|Date
|align=center style="border-style: none none solid solid; background: #e3e3e3"|Event
|align=center style="border-style: none none solid solid; background: #e3e3e3"|Alternate Name/s
|align=center style="border-style: none none solid solid; background: #e3e3e3"|Location
|align=center style="border-style: none none solid solid; background: #e3e3e3"|Attendance
|align=center style="border-style: none none solid solid; background: #e3e3e3"|PPV Buyrate
|align=center style="border-style: none none solid solid; background: #e3e3e3"|Notes
|-align=center
|March 11
|UFC 2: No Way Out
|UFC 2  The Ultimate Fighting Championship 2
| Denver, Colorado, US
|2,000
|300,000
|
|-align=center
|September 9
|UFC 3: The American Dream
|
| Charlotte, North Carolina, US
|
|
|
|-align=center
|December 16
|UFC 4: Revenge of the Warriors
|

|  Tulsa, Oklahoma, US
|5,857
|
|
|-align=center

Motorsport

Multi-sport event

 1994 Commonwealth Games held in Victoria, British Columbia, Canada

Professional Wrestling
 June 11 Hulk Hogan signs with World Championship Wrestling.

Radiosport
 Seventh Amateur Radio Direction Finding World Championship held in Södertälje, Sweden.

Rugby league
 30 April – 1993–94 Challenge Cup final is won by Wigan 26–16 over Leeds at Wembley Stadium before 78,348
 1 June – 1994 World Club Challenge match is won by Wigan 20–14 over Brisbane Broncos at Queensland Sport & Athletics Centre before 54,220
 20 June – 1994 State of Origin is won by New South Wales in the third and deciding game of the three-match series against Queensland at Lang Park before 40,665
 25 September – 1994 NSWRL season Grand Final is won by Canberra Raiders 36–12 over Canterbury-Bankstown Bulldogs at Sydney Football Stadium before 42,234
 15 November – 1994 Ashes are retained by Australia in the third and deciding game of the three–match series against Great Britain at Elland Road before 39,468
 4 December – Béziers, France: Australian captain Mal Meninga plays the last game of his illustrious career, leading Australia to a 74–0 victory over France and scoring the final try of the game

Rugby union
 100th Five Nations Championship series is won by Wales

Snooker
 World Snooker Championship – Stephen Hendry beats Jimmy White 18–17
 World rankings – Stephen Hendry remains world number one for 1994/95

Speed skating
 February 18 - Dan Jansen skates world record 1000 meter (1:12.43) in Hamar

Swimming
 Seventh FINA World Championships, held in Rome, Italy (September 1 – 11)
 Fourth European Sprint Championships, held in Stavanger, Norway (December 3 – 4)
 Germany wins the most medals (13), and the most gold medals (7)
 March 13 – Alexander Popov clocks 21.50 to break the world record in the men's 50m freestyle (short course) in Desenzano del Garda, Italy

Tennis
 Grand Slam in tennis men's results:
 Australian Open – Pete Sampras
 French Open – Sergi Bruguera
 Wimbledon championships – Pete Sampras
 U.S. Open – Andre Agassi
 Grand Slam in tennis women's results:
 Australian Open – Steffi Graf
 French Open – Arantxa Sánchez Vicario
 Wimbledon championships – Conchita Martínez
 U.S. Open – Arantxa Sánchez Vicario
 Davis Cup – Sweden wins 4–1 over Russia.
 Federation Cup – In the last event to be called the "Federation Cup", Spain wins 3–0 over the USA. The following year would see the event renamed the Fed Cup.

Triathlon
ITU World Championships held in Wellington, New Zealand
ITU World Cup (ten races) started in Japan and ended in Mexico
ETU European Championships held in Eichstätt, Germany

Volleyball
 Men's World League: Italy
 Men's World Championship: Italy
 Men's European Beach Volleyball Championships: Jan Kvalheim and Bjørn Maaseide (Norway)
 Women's World Grand Prix: Brazil
 Women's World Championship: Cuba
 Women's European Beach Volleyball Championships: Beate Bühler and Danja Müsch (Germany)

Water polo
 Men's World Championship: Italy
 Women's World Championship: Hungary

Wrestling
World Wrestling Championships
Men's Freestyle Team: Turkey
Men's Greco-Roman Team: Russia
Women's Team: Japan
NCAA Wrestling team championship won by Oklahoma State University
(see links, above, for individual medals)

Awards
 Associated Press Male Athlete of the Year – George Foreman, Boxing
 Associated Press Female Athlete of the Year – Bonnie Blair, Speed skating

References

 
Sports by year